Collette Stevenson (née McDade, born 1969) is a Scottish National Party (SNP) politician. She has served as the Member of the Scottish Parliament (MSP) for East Kilbride since May 2021.

She served as a local councillor for South Lanarkshire's East Kilbride Central South ward from 2017 and was depute provost at the time of her election as an MSP; she stood down as a councillor ahead of the 2022 local elections.

Stevenson was raised in East Kilbride, where she lives with her family. A graduate in business from the University of the West of Scotland, she was employed in administrative roles at the local authority. She was a founding member of the East Kilbride branch of Women for Independence.

References

External links 
 
 Twitter

Date of birth missing (living people)
1969 births
Living people
Scottish National Party MSPs
Scottish National Party councillors
Councillors in South Lanarkshire
Members of the Scottish Parliament 2021–2026
Female members of the Scottish Parliament
People from East Kilbride
Alumni of the University of the West of Scotland
Politicians from South Lanarkshire
Women councillors in Scotland